Sanghe Jagir is a village in Nakodar.  Nakodar is a tehsil in the city Jalandhar of Indian state of Punjab.

STD code 
Sanghe Jagir's STD code and post code are 01821 and 144043 respectively.

References

Villages in Jalandhar district
Villages in Nakodar tehsil